People called Giménez or Gimenez include:
Andrés Giménez (born 1998), Major League Baseball player
Ángel Giménez (born 1955), Spanish tennis player
Carlos Giménez (disambiguation), several people
Ceferino Giménez Malla (1861–1936), Spanish catechist
Chris Gimenez (born 1982), American professional baseball player
Christian Giménez (footballer, born 1974), Argentine football striker
Christian Giménez (footballer, born 1981), Argentine football midfielder
Damián Giménez (born 1982), Argentine football player
Edison Giménez (born 1981), Paraguayan football player
Ernesto Giménez Caballero (1899–1988), Spanish writer and diplomat
Estela Giménez (born 1979), Spanish gymnast
Fernando Giménez (born 1984), Paraguayan football midfielder
Gerónimo Giménez (1854–1923), Spanish conductor and composer
Guilherme Gimenez de Souza (1995–2016), Brazilian footballer
Héctor Giménez (baseball) (born 1982), Venezuelan baseball catcher
Herminio Giménez (1905–1991), Paraguayan composer
José María Giménez de Vargas (born 1995), Uruguayan football defender
José María Giménez Pérez (born 1980), Spanish football goalkeeper known as "Chema"
Juan Giménez (born 1943), Argentine comic book artist
Juan Carlos Giménez Ferreyra (born 1960), Paraguayan boxer
Luciana Gimenez (born 1970), Brazil fashion model and TV show hostess
Matías Giménez (born 1983), Argentine football winger
Pablo Giménez (born 1981), Paraguayan football player
Remberto Giménez (1898–1977), Paraguayan musician
Santiago Giménez (born 2001), Mexican footballer
Sébastien Gimenez (born 1974), French football goalkeeper
Susana Giménez (born 1944), Argentine actress and diva
Teresa Canela Giménez (born 1959), Spanish chess player
Álvaro Giménez (born 1991), Spanish footballer

See also 
Gimenez stain
Jiménez (disambiguation)
Ximénez (disambiguation)

Surnames of Spanish origin